The 1972 Southern Conference men's basketball tournament took place from March 2–4, 1972 at the Greenville Memorial Auditorium in Greenville, South Carolina. The East Carolina Pirates, led by head coach Tom Quinn, won their first Southern Conference title and received the automatic berth to the 1972 NCAA tournament.

Format
All of the conference's eight members were eligible for the tournament. Teams were seeded based on conference winning percentage. The tournament used a preset bracket consisting of three rounds.

Bracket

* Overtime game

See also
List of Southern Conference men's basketball champions

References

Tournament
Southern Conference men's basketball tournament
Southern Conference men's basketball tournament
Southern Conference men's basketball tournament